Caroline Valenta (27 May 1924 – 20 February 2013) was an American photojournalist. She was born in 1924 in Shiner, Texas. She attended the University of Houston, but left in 1945, at the end of her senior year, to take a full-time staff photographer position at the Houston Post. She was the first woman photographer employed by the paper, where she worked for eight years starting in 1945. Vlaneta gained international recognition for her photographs of the Texas City disaster in 1947.

Her work was included in the 1949 exhibition The Exact Instant at the Museum of Modern Art in New York.

Her work is included in the collection of the Museum of Fine Arts Houston.

References

1924 births
2013 deaths
20th-century American photographers
21st-century American photographers
20th-century American women artists
21st-century American women artists
American photojournalists
American women photographers
Women photojournalists